New Generation International Schools are a group of international schools in Egypt. New Generation practices "The Balanced Approach," which encompasses the promise not to discriminate against race, gender identity, or religious beliefs, and the guarantee that students will learn on an international level while still respecting their cultural identity and Egyptian roots.

The school offers American Diploma while keeping Arabic Studies in the curriculum.

New Generation is fully licensed by The Egyptian Ministry of Education, and has collaborated with them on the Education First Foundation protocol, which has witnessed the training of over 20,000 public school teachers across 721 schools.

They are also accredited by the NCA-CASI's AdvancED, the largest community of education professionals in the world, and scored 3.27, one of the highest Index of Education Quality (IEQ) school evaluations in the Middle East.

They have also been accredited by the Middle States Association of Colleges and Schools (MSA), an institution that offers objective validation of school quality and student achievement, and fosters continuous school improvement.

School curricula 

List of curricula the school offers:

Advanced Placement International Diploma (APID)
French National Program Component (Conseil de Classe) 
Advanced Placement - University Credit
Senior Project IB Diploma Extended Essay Requirement
Community Service - IB CAS Requirement
National Honor Society: U.S. Academic Honors Recognition
Arabic, Religion, and Cultural Studies:  Egyptian Ministry of Education
AERO Standards
Trilingual - French Baccalaureate Requirement
Theory of Knowledge 
Character education
International Academic Field Trips
Advanced ICDL
FIT I and FIT II: German Language Proficiency Diplomas
DELF: French Language Proficiency Diploma

References

External links 
The schools' official website
Administration and staff

International schools in Egypt
Private schools in Cairo
Educational institutions established in 2005
2005 establishments in Egypt